Alessandrini is an Italian surname. Notable people with the surname include:

Anthony Alessandrini (1921-1988), American jazz pianist
Antonio Alessandrini (1786-1861), Italian zoologist
Cristian Alessandrini (born 1985), Argentine footballer 
Gerard Alessandrini (born 1953), American playwright
Giancarlo Alessandrini (born 1950), Italian comic artist
Giulio Alessandrini (1506-1590), Italian Renaissance physician 
Goffredo Alessandrini (1904-1978), Italian script writer and film director
Lorenza Alessandrini (born 1990), Italian ice dancer
Marco Alessandrini (born 1970), Italian politician
Max Alessandrini (born 1965), Italian animator
Renato Alessandrini (1890-1928), Italian explorer 
Rinaldo Alessandrini (born 1960), Italian musician
Romain Alessandrini (born 1989), French footballer
Valeria Alessandrini (born 1975), Italian politician

See also 
Parco Emilio Alessandrini, memorial park in Milan, Italy

Italian-language surnames
Surnames of Italian origin
Patronymic surnames
Surnames from given names